Gjellerupia is a genus of plants in the family Opiliaceae described as a genus in 1912.

It contains only one known species, Gjellerupia papuana, endemic to New Guinea.

References

Opiliaceae
Monotypic Santalales genera
Endemic flora of New Guinea